Kaneville Township is one of sixteen townships in Kane County, Illinois, USA.  As of the 2010 census, its population was 1,264 and it contained 508 housing units.

Geography
The township is divided roughly into northern and southern halves by Interstate 88.

Cities, towns, villages
 Kaneville

Unincorporated towns
 Kaneland Estates at 
 Pine View at 
 Troxel at 
(This list is based on USGS data and may include former settlements.)

Cemeteries
The township contains these three cemeteries: Gardner, Kaneville and Old Saint Mary's.

Demographics

School districts
 Kaneland Community Unit School District 302

Political districts
 Illinois's 14th congressional district
 State House District 50
 State Senate District 25

References
 
 United States Census Bureau 2009 TIGER/Line Shapefiles
 United States National Atlas

External links
 City-Data.com
 Illinois State Archives
 Township Officials of Illinois
 Kaneville Township History

Townships in Kane County, Illinois
Townships in Illinois
1849 establishments in Illinois